Kjwan  is the self-titled album by Kjwan and their first studio album. It was released through Sony Music Philippines in 2004. The album contained their singles "Daliri", and "Twilight".

Track listing

Personnel
Marc Abaya - vocals
Kelley Mangahas - bass
Jorel Corpus - guitars, percussion, vocals
J-Hoon Balbuena - drums, vocals

Accolades

References

2004 albums
Kjwan albums